Australia participated at the 2020 Summer Paralympics in Tokyo, Japan, from 24 August to 5 September 2021. It sent its largest away team - 179 athletes to a Summer Paralympics. Australia finished eighth on the gold medal table and sixth on the total medals table.

In May 2017, Paralympics Australia announced Kate McLoughlin as the Chef de Mission, McLoughlin held the position at the 2016 Rio Paralympics. In November 2019, wheelchair rugby player Ryley Batt and table tennis player Daniela di Toro, were named as co-captains. They were also named as joint flag bearers at the Opening Ceremony. Ellie Cole was the flag bearer at the Closing Ceremony. Cole became Australia's most decorated female Paralympian during the Games with her silver and bronze medals in swimming taking her to 17 Paralympic medals.

Notable achievements at the Games:

 Multiple gold medallists: William Martin (swimming) - 3 gold, 1 silver ; Madison de Rozario (athletics) - 2 gold, 1 bronze ; Curtis McGrath (canoeing) - 2 gold ; Ben Popham (swimming) - 2 gold, 1 silver ; Rowan Crothers (swimming) - 2 gold, 1 silver.
 Ellie Cole with two bronze medals became Australia's leading female Paralympic medallist with 17 medals - 6 gold, 5 silver, 6 bronze.
 Gold medallists repeating Rio Paralympics gold - James Turner (athletics), Vanessa Low (athletics), Curtis McGrath (canoeing), Lakeisha Patterson (swimming), Rachael Watson (swimming), Dylan Alcott (wheelchair tennis).
 First time Paralympic gold medallists - Madison de Rozario (athletics), Paige Greco (cycling), Emily Petricola (cycling), Amanda Reid (cycling), Darren Hicks (cycling), William Martin (swimming), Rowan Crothers (swimming), Ben Popham (swimming), Benjamin Hance (swimming)
 New sports - Janine Watson won Australia's first medal - bronze in Para Taekwondo.
 Boccia won it first medal since 1996 and second only medal with Daniel Michel's bronze medal.
 Table tennis had its greatest medal success at a Paralympics - 2 gold and 4 silver medals.

Medallists

| width="78%" align="left" valign="top" |

| width="22%" align="left" valign="top" |

Medals by sport

Medals by date

Medals by gender

Funding
Sport Australia provided funding to Paralympics Australia – $3,735,548 (2016/17), $5,019,780 (2017/18), $13,578,880 (2018/19), $8,634,280 (2019/20). The 2021/22 Australian Government budget provided $3.5 million due to increased operational costs for the Australian Paralympic Team's participation in the Tokyo Paralympic Games due to the impact of COVID-19. Sport Australia also provides funding to national sports organisations to support their Paralympic athletes. The breakdown of this funding is not available.

Prime Minister Scott Morrison announced in Parliament on 2 September 2021 that the Australian Government would finance equivalent payments to Australian Paralympic medallists to that provided by the Australian Olympic Committee to Olympic medallists - $20,000 cash bonus for Olympic gold medallists, while silver medallists and bronze medallists take home $15,000 and $10,000.

COVID-19

Paralympics Australia required all Australian athletes and officials to have a COVID-19 vaccination to be considered for selection, whereas the Australian Olympic Committee and the International Paralympic Committee only strongly recommended the vaccine for those travelling to Tokyo. Paralympics Australia stated "This underpins PA's duty of care and the responsibility to do everything in our power to keep each and every team member safe for the duration of our stay in Tokyo and our journey home again."

Competitors
Source:

 
Please note that guides in athletics and paratriathlon and cox in rowing are counted as athletes at the Paralympics by Paralympics Australia.

Archery 

Team of four archers selected on 26 July 2021. Men – Jonathon Milne, Peter Marchant, Taymon Kenton-Smith; Women – Imalia Oktrininda.

|-
|align=left| Jonathon Milne
|align=left rowspan=1|Men's individual compound
|692
|8
|
|align="center" |L 141–143
|align="center" colspan=4|Did not advance
|-
|align=left| Peter Marchant
|align=left rowspan=1|Men's individual compound
|664
|31
|align="center" |W 138–136
|align="center" |L 139–141
|align="center" colspan=4|Did not advance
|-
|align=left| Taymon Kenton-Smith
|align=left rowspan=1|Men's individual recurve
|604
|18
|align="center" |L 4-6
|align="center" colspan=5|Did not advance
|-
|align=left| Imalia Oktrininda
|align=left rowspan=1|Women's individual recurve
|564
|13
|align="center" |W 7–1
|align="center" |L 0–6
|align="center" colspan=4|Did not advance
|-
|align=left| Taymon Kenton-SmithImalia Oktrininda
|align=left rowspan=1|Mixed team recurve
|1186
|8
|L 0–6
|align="center" colspan=5|Did not advance
|}

Athletics 

Team of 36 athletes selected on 23 July 2021.

Men
Track

Field

Technical officials flagged that Hodgetts and Ecuador's Jordi Congo-Villalba and Malaysian Muhammad Ziyad Zolkefli were late to the pre-event call-room, and even though the competition went ahead the results of the trio would be registered as DNS.

Women
Track

Field

Badminton

Badminton will make its debut at the Summer Paralympics, two athletes were selected – Caitlin Dransfield and Grant Manzoney.

Boccia

Daniel Michel, Spencer Cotie and Jamieson Leeson were selected on 21 June 2021.

Cycling

12 athletes selected on 9 July 2021. Men – Gordon Allan, Grant Allen, Alistair Donohoe, Stuart Jones, Darren Hicks, David Nicholas, Stuart Tripp; Women – Carol Cooke, Paige Greco, Meg Lemon, Emily Petricola, Amanda Reid

Track Events — Women

Track Events — Men

Track Events — Mixed

Road Events — Women

Road Events — Men

Equestrian

On 10 July 2021, four riders were selected. Sharon Jarvis became the first Australian Paralympian to be selected for three Games.

Individual competition

Team competition

Goalball

Women's tournament
The Australian women's goalball team qualified in a ranking tournament in the US in June–July 2019. The team was announced on 18 June 2021 as Jennifer Blow, Meica Horsburgh, Raissa Martin, Amy Ridley, Brodie Smith, and Tyan Taylor.

Group stage

Quarterfinal

Judo

On 27 July 2021, Wayne Phipps was selected, Australia's first representative since 2008 Summer Paralympics.

Paracanoe

Paratriathlon

A team of six athletes and two guides on 19 July 2021. Four athletes were selected to make their Paralympics Games debut.

Men

Women

Rowing

Australia qualified three boats for each of the following rowing classes into the Paralympic regatta. Rowing crews in the men's single sculls and mixed coxed four qualified after successfully entering the top eight at the 2019 World Rowing Championships in Ottensheim, Austria. Meanwhile, mixed double sculls crews qualified after finishing second at the 2021 Final Paralympic
Qualification Regatta in Gavirate, Italy.

At 12 July 2021, Australia eight rowers to compete. Kathryn Ross was selected four her fourth Games and Erik Horrie his third Games.

Qualification Legend: FA=Final A (medal); FB=Final B (non-medal); R=Repechage

Shooting

Three athletes were selected on 20 July 2021.

Swimming

32 athletes were selected on 16 June 2021. Matthew Levy was selected for his fifth Paralympics. There are 15 debutants. Braedan Jason was added to the team on 14 July 2021 after Australia was granted an additional spot. Blake Cochrane was added to the team on 26 July 2021.
Men's events

 Swimmers who participated in the heats only.

Women's events

Mixed events

Table tennis

Australia entered eleven athletes into the table tennis competition at the games. Ten of them qualified from 2019 ITTF Oceanian Para Championships which was held in Darwin, and Yang Qian qualified via World Ranking allocation. Team of 11 athletes selected on 5 July 2021.

Men

Women

Taekwondo

Australia selected one athlete for the inaugural para taekwondo competition.

Wheelchair basketball

Gliders team of 12 athletes was announced on 16 July 2021. Rollers team of 12 athletes was announced on 21 July 2021.

Men's tournament

Group B 

Quarter-finals

5th–6th classification match

Bracket

Women's tournament

Group A

Classification playoffs −9th/10th

Wheelchair rugby

Australia national wheelchair rugby team qualified for the Games by winning the silver medal at the 2018 World Championships in Sydney.

Team roster
On 29 July 2021, Australia selected twelve players two compete, with four athletes making their games debut.

 Ryley Batt
 Chris Bond
 Ben Fawcett
 Andrew Harrison
 Shae Graham 
 Jake Howe 
 Josh Hose
 Jason Lees
 Michael Ozanne 
 Richard Voris 
 Jayden Warn

Group stage

Medal round bracket

Wheelchair tennis

Australia qualified four players entries for wheelchair tennis. Three players qualified by the world rankings, meanwhile the other qualified by received the bipartite commission invitation allocation quotas.

Facts 
 Paralympics Games representation: Seven – Christie Dawes (athletics) Daniela di Toro (tennis / table tennis) ; Six – Angie Ballard (athletics) ; Five – Matthew Levy (swimming), Lei Li Na (table tennis), Tristan Knowles (wheelchair basketball), Shaun Norris (wheelchair basketball), Ryley Batt (wheelchair rugby) Ben Weekes (wheelchair tennis)
 Indigenous athletes – Amanda Reid (cycling), Ruby Storm (swimming), Samantha Schmidt (athletics)
 Yougest – Isabella Vincent (swimming) and oldest Peter Marchant (archery)
 Dual Paralympian and Olympian – Melissa Tapper (table tennis)
 Multiple Paralympic sports representation – Daniela di Toro (tennis / table tennis), Michael Auprince (swimming/ wheelchair basketball), Dylan Alcott (wheelchair basketball/wheelchair tennis), Amanda Reid (swimming/ cycling). Hannah Dodd (equestrian/wheelchair basketball) 
 Represented other Paralympic nations – Ma Lin, Lei Li Na, Yang Qian (All represented China in table tennis), Vanessa Low (represented Germany in athletics)

See also

Australia at the 2020 Summer Olympics
Australia at the Paralympics
Australian Paralympic Archery team
Australian Paralympic Athletics Team
Australian Paralympic Boccia Team
Australian Paralympic Cycling Team
Australian Paralympic Equestrian Team
Australian Paralympic Paracanoe Team
Australian Paralympic Paratriathlon Team
Australian Paralympic Rowing Team
Australian Paralympic Sailing Team
Australian Paralympic Shooting Team
Australian Paralympic Swim Team
Australian Paralympic Table Tennis Team
Australian Paralympic wheelchair tennis team
Australia men's national wheelchair basketball team
Australia national wheelchair rugby team
Australia women's national goalball team

References

External links
Official website
Paralympics Australia Media Handbook Tokyo 2020

Nations at the 2020 Summer Paralympics
2020
2021 in Australian sport